Vernonia actaea is a species of perennial plant in the family Asteraceae. It is endemic to Sulawesi.

References 

actaea
Endemic flora of Sulawesi